Dorothy's Harp is a studio album by jazz harpist Dorothy Ashby released in 1969 via the Cadet label. A few years after releasing Dorothy’s Harp, she started working with Stevie Wonder. The record includes two Brazilian-touched compositions: "Reza" and "Canto de Ossanha". The album was re-released as a CD in 2006.

Reception
A reviewer of Dusty Groove wrote "One of the grooviest Dorothy Ashby albums of the 60s – a set that has her already-great jazz work on harp backed by Chicago soul arrangements from Richard Evans – all in a blend that's somewhere in the territory of the Soulful Strings, but even groovier! And as an added bonus, Odell Brown even plays a bit of Fender Rhodes on the record – which sounds especially great! Both Ashby and Evans are at the height of their powers here – mixing together bits of jazz, soul, and trippier elements in a sublime late 60s Cadet Records blend – one that's carried off perfectly on the original tunes "Truth Spoken Here", "Tornado", "Cause I Need It", and "Just Had To Tell Somebody" – but which also sounds great on some of the album's cool covers too! Other titles include Brazilian numbers "Reza" and "Canto De Ossanha" – both of which are transformed in Dorothy's hands – plus "This Girl's In Love", "By the Time I Get to Phoenix", and "Windmills of Your Mind"!".

Track listing

Personnel
Design – Randy Harter
Electric piano [Fender] – Odell Brown
Engineer – Stu Black
Flute – Lennie Druss (tracks: B5)
Oboe – Lennie Druss (tracks: B3)
Photography – Jeff Lowenthal
Producer – Richard Evans

References

External links
DOROTHY'S HARP Review
A Dorothy Ashby Discography

Dorothy Ashby albums
1969 albums
Cadet Records albums